Pwint San (also spelt Pwint Hsan; born 13 July 1961 in Rangoon, Burma) is the incumbent Minister of Labour of Myanmar. He served as Minister for Commerce from 3 February 2021 to 19 August 2022 in the aftermath of the 2021 Myanmar coup d'état by the Burmese military.

Career

Pwint San is a medical doctor by training, and later became a businessman. He became a politician of the Burmese military's proxy party, the Union Solidarity and Development Party, and served as a deputy commerce minister during Thein Sein's presidency.

Sanctions 
On 17 May 2021, the U.S. Department of the Treasury added Pwint San to its Specially Designated Nationals (SDN) list.

Personal life 
Pwint San's son, Bryan Tun, is a medical doctor in Australia.

References

Burmese businesspeople
Government ministers of Myanmar
Living people
1961 births
Specially Designated Nationals and Blocked Persons List
Individuals related to Myanmar sanctions